The Pakistan blind cricket team is the national blind cricket team of Pakistan. Running and organised by the Pakistan Blind Cricket Council (PBCC) which is affiliated with the World Blind Cricket Council (WBCC). The team participates in One Day International and Twenty20 International cricket matches.

Tournament History

40 Over Blind Cricket World Cup 
 1998 Blind Cricket World Cup – runners-up
 2002 Blind Cricket World Cup – Champions
 2006 Blind Cricket World Cup – Champions
 2014 Blind Cricket World Cup – runners-up

Blind T20 World Cup 
 2012 Blind World T20 – runners-up
 2017 Blind World T20 – runners-up

Blind T20 Asia Cup 
 2015 – runners-up

Key Milestone 
Pakistan and South Africa played in the inaugural Blind cricket test match in 2000 and Pakistan recorded a 94 run victory over them.

Current squad 
Below is the list of current squad with their position category.
 Ali Murtaza – B2
 Amir Ishfaq – B2
 Anees Javed – B2
 Arfan Majeed – B2
 Gulab Khan – B1
 Iftikhar Hussain – B3
 Masood Jan – B2
 Muhammad Akram – B3
 Muhammad Ayaz – B1
 Muhammad Idrees Saleem – B1
 Muhammad Jameel (vice-captain) – B3
 Muhammad Waqas – B1
 Muhammad Zafar – B1
 Muhammad Zohaib Ghafoor – B3
 Nisar Ali – B2
 Tahir Ali – B3
 Zeeshan Abbasi (captain) – B2

World Records 
 Pakistan has the record for the highest ever total in Blind T20I history as well as the highest ever Blind T20 World Cup total when they scored 373/4 against the West Indies during the 2017 Blind World T20.
 Pakistan also set the highest ever team total in 40 overs blind cricket against Australia (563/4) at the 2018 Blind Cricket World Cup. In fact, Pakistan's 563/4 is also the highest ever team total in Blind Cricket World Cup history.
 Pakistan is the only team which was able to qualify for the finals in every editions of the Blind Cricket World Cup.
 Masood Jan of Pakistan set the Guinness World Record for the highest ever individual score in a Blind Cricket World Cup match (262*) during the inaugural Blind Cricket World Cup in 1998 against the eventual winners South Africa.
 Muhammad Akram set the highest individual score in a Blind T20I innings(264) which is also the record in the history of Blind T20 World Cup.

Achievements in Brief: (Pakistan Blind Cricket Council) 
 Pakistan Blind Cricket team emerged as Runners-up in the inaugural Twenty-20 Blind Cricket World Cup Dec 2012 and then in 2017
 Pakistan Blind Cricket team reached in the final of all the three editions of Blind Cricket World Cups (One-Day Cricket)and won the last two World Cups consecutively.
 Pakistan won 11 International series out of played 13.
 Pakistan Blind Cricket team remained undefeated for five (5) consecutive years in one-day International Cricket.
 Pakistan holds the record of  longest winning streak in International Cricket i.e. consecutively won 27(Twenty seven) one-day International matches.
 Pakistan triumph 7 consecutive one-day series. (Vs India, Australia, South Africa, England (twice), Sri Lanka and Nepal)
 Pakistan consecutively won 6 Twenty-20 series.  (Vs the same aforementioned opponents).
 World record highest total of 517 runs in One-Day International set against South Africa.
 World record highest margin victory of 399 runs Vs South Africa.
 World record of highest total successfully chased of 439 runs against England (Sharjah April 2010), which is the highest total successfully chased in any form of cricket.
 World record highest score in T-20 cricket of 274 runs, set against England April 2010. 
 World record highest partnership of unbeaten 390 runs.
 Here is a table on other world records set by Pakistan National Blind Cricket Team

See also 

 Pakistan national cricket team
 Pakistan national women's cricket team

References

External links 
 

Pakistan in international cricket
C
Blind cricket teams
Parasports in Pakistan